Libyan–Saudi Arabian relations refers to the current and historical relations between Libya and Saudi Arabia. Libya has an embassy in Riyadh and Saudi Arabia has an embassy in Tripoli, though the Saudi embassy has closed since 2015.

History
The Arab conquest of North Africa happened in 7th century and was a major influence on bringing North Africans, including modern-day Libyans, to be Arabized and Islamized. Thanks to this Islamization and Arabization, Saudi Arabia and Libya therefore shared an intertwined history together, beginning with various Arab Caliphates, as well as Saudi Arabia and Libya being together ruled by the later Ottoman Empire until the end of World War I.

Modern relations

Saudi Arabia and the Kingdom of Libya
Saudi Arabia and Libya established relations in 1951 when Libya was freed from European colonization. The early Kingdom of Libya, just like Saudi Arabia, forged closer ties with each other as well as alliances with most Western countries such as the United States and the United Kingdom. Dealing with the wave of pan-Arabism at the time due to the Arab–Israeli conflict, Saudi Arabia and Libya backed a united front in support of the Palestinians, although both avoided direct military involvement in the conflict. However at the 1967 Arab League summit held in Khartoum, Sudan, Libya, Saudi Arabia and Kuwait agreed to provide  oil-backed subsidies to Egypt, Syria and Jordan in the Six-Day War, although the war was swiftly ended with an Israeli victory.

Saudi Arabia and Gaddafi's Libya
The era where Gaddafi reigned Libya was marked with tensions. Muammer Gaddafi openly denounced Saudi Arabia, and sought to reinforce pan-Arabism, aligned Libya to the Soviet Union. In response, Saudi Arabia and Libya had a hostile relationship. In 1984, Saudi police thwarted an attempt by Gaddafi to assassinate Libyan dissidents in Mecca.

Relations between two countries witnessed some minor improvement post-Cold War, as Gaddafi stopped being proactive on his foreign diplomacy in exchange for restoration of relations with most countries, including Saudi Arabia. However, in 2003, Libya was accused of plotting an assassination attempt against Saudi Crown Prince Abdullah by hiring an Eritrean-born American Muslim activist. Abdullah survived and eventually became King of Saudi Arabia two years later, where he would go on to have a confrontation with Gaddafi in the 2009 Arab League summit.

A leaked record by Qatari opposition in 2020 revealed that Gaddafi and Kuwaiti radical preacher Hakem al-Mutairi had sought to destabilize the Gulf during the Arab Spring.

Saudi Arabia and post-Gaddafi Libya
Saudi Arabia was quick to throw support for the Libyan opposition in 2011 as part of their attempt to remove Gaddafi's power in the region, and in line with the Arab League.

As Libya descended closer to chaos and violence, thus erupting the Second Libyan Civil War, Saudi Arabia has started to involve in the conflict. Since 2014, Saudi Arabia has thrown a significant support for Khalifa Haftar's force fighting in Libya, thus allied with Egypt, United Arab Emirates, Russia and France due to Haftar's anti-Islamist stance. According to the Wall Street Journal and retrieved by Al Jazeera, Saudi Arabia had given millions of dollars to support Haftar's army in its failed attempt to takeover Tripoli after a meeting with General Haftar by Saudi King Salman.

Due to Haftar's defeat, Saudi Arabia was thought to have become increasingly involved in Libya.

References

 
Libya
Saudi Arabia